is a Japanese light novel series by Takumi Hiiragiboshi with illustrations by Yū Asaba. Media Factory has published eleven volumes since 2012 under their MF Bunko J imprint. It has received two manga adaptations. A 12-episode anime television series adaptation by Eight Bit aired between January 4 and March 22, 2015.

Plot

The students must pass a battle during the qualification ceremony of the freshmen day in order to be enrolled in the academy. The school uses a special Duo system in which students are assigned partners. Tor is paired with Julie Sigtuna, a silver-haired girl from Scandinavia, and must share a room with her.

Characters

Main

Tor is the narrator of the Absolute Duo light novels. He enrolls in Koryo Academy with the hope of getting stronger so he can avenge the death of his younger sister . He is dubbed an Irregular for having a shield for a Blaze. He learns a powerful punch attack to use in conjunction with his Blaze. Julie sometimes refers to him as Thor. After spending some time with Julie, his goal switches from avenging his sister to becoming strong so that he can protect Julie. He obtains the Level 4 Sublimation which is "Aegis Desire".

Julie is a girl with red eyes and silver hair, styled in twin tails who becomes Tor's Duo partner at the academy. She takes a liking towards Tor and after some time she becomes his duo. She is from a village named Gimlé in Scandinavia. Her Blaze is a Sword Type, known as Twin Blades. The reason she came to Japan and enrolled to Koryo Academy is that she wants to get stronger to avenge her family's death; the scar on her back serves as a reminder of the incident. Because of this she seeks out Tor for help and to teach her his Final Move. One of her interesting features is her single strain of hair that stands and moves around

Tor and Julie's classmate. She is described as a yamato nadeshiko: smart and talented and possesses a dignified atmosphere. She cares very much about the people who are close to her especially Miyabi, who despite of being weak still chooses her to form a duo. She is very much into martial arts and Shogi. She can never tolerate idly work, so she always wakes others when they're about to be late. Being a vegetarian, she often gives Tor a plate of vegetables to maintain his stamina and power. Her Blaze is a Kusarigama.

Tor's classmate who forms a Duo with Tomoe. She is a buxom girl who tends to be shy around others. Her shyness, especially around boys, comes from how she used to be in an all-girls school before coming to Koryo Academy. She lacks stamina that keeps her from doing any physical activity for long periods of time. She eventually comes to realize she is in love with Tor and confesses, however, he instead turned her down telling her that he's too weak (having a flashback of his sister's death). Despite his rejection, she takes Tor´s words to her heart, even accepting Equipment Smith´s offer to become stronger, getting a Unit suit, despite having to fight against her friends. Her Blaze is a huge and heavy lance that is capable of doing large scale destruction, however, she has a hard time using it as she lacks stamina.

A transfer student from England came from an affluent family. She is a very exceptional student who at a young age has learned how to shoot and hunt, however, she is also selfish and arrogant. She is called an "Exception" and due to this, she claims to be able to do anything regardless of the rules. She went to Japan in order to form a duo with Tor after hearing news about his capability and being special just like Lilith, however much to her disappointment Tor declines. She later falls in love with Tor, and declares he will be her future husband and win his heart. Though she is officially enrolled in Koryo Academy, she never attends class claiming that she had already finished her studies a long time ago which is why she prefers loitering around the school garden sipping tea with her confidant Sarah. Her Blaze is a rifle, and she is a superb marksman. Though she is armed with a weapon that she can fire from a distance, she is surprisingly very agile to the point that she can shoot anybody at point blank range.

Other

The Chairwoman of Koryo Academy, and is always seen wearing a Gothic Lolita dress. Her way of running the school is so ruthless that she actually encourages battle amongst the students. She's known as the Blaze Diabolica.

Tor's homeroom teacher, who is always energetic and dresses like a maid with bunny ears, which greatly disturbs her entire class. She has two personalities; the first one is a child-like, carefree, and happy person who likes calling her students various names, while the second is a foul-mouthed, sadistic, and ruthless villain, who doesn't even think twice about attacking her own students. Despite her cold attitude, it is shown that she does care for her students, as she defended them against K's attack and even gave them a thumbs up. She does not appear to like a lot of attention on her, as she is seen running away from a bunch of students the next day. Her Blaze is a sword. She gains Level 4 Sublimation from Sakuya and she has a new ability "Ouburos"

Imari is the first person Tor talks to after entering the school. However, she is soon expelled from the school after losing against Tor during the entrance ceremony's combat exam. Her Blaze consists of a single sword, which she wields like a katana. She reappeared when Tor's class were sent to summer training camp at some remote island where Koryo Academy has another branch, where students like her who failed the combat exam from the main branch where actually transferred there and were trained to become shinobis. She was also one of the greeting parties who ambushed Tor's class the moment they arrived to the island.

Commonly known as Tora. He is Tor's childhood friend who is also considered an Irregular. His Blaze is a katar.

Known by his nickname Tatsu, he is Tora's roommate. Tatsu has a muscular physique; he is also the tallest person in class. His Blaze is a naginata. Rito often calls him "Barbarian".

K

A soldier of Equipment Smith and the younger brother of Ryan Wayfair. Since he lost his family at a young age, he was sold to Equipment Smith, who made him a ruthless killing machine that only cares about power and results.

Tor's former best friend who is responsible for killing Tor's sister Otoha and Julie's father in the past.

A scientist who developed the Unit suits and resents Sakuya's grandfather for defeating him many years ago, believing Units are superior to Exceeds. After K is defeated and he begins to insult him and calling him a failure, K kills him.

Silent Diva is a young woman, with her light blue hair coming down to her hips, and she has purple clothes with diamonds on each side of her hair, and she has purple eyes, just like Sakuya. Also known as Beatrix Emerald.

Sara is Lilith Bristol's female butler. Sara comes from a family that serves as their butlers.

Also known as Hugo.

Also known as Cloweiss.

Also known as Ougi.

One of Rito Tsukimi's student.

Tor's deceased sister who was killed by Sakaki Narukami.

K's brother who died after protecting K.

Imari Nagakura's duo partner.

Media

Light novels
The first light novel was published on August 24, 2012, by Media Factory under their MF Bunko J imprint. Eleven volumes have been published as of July 2016.

Manga
A manga adaptation with art by Shin'ichirō Nariie started serialization in Media Factory's seinen manga magazine Monthly Comic Alive from April 27, 2013, and has been collected in a three tankōbon volumes. A second spin-off four-panel comedy manga adaptation titled  with art by Tor Oiwaka will also be serialized in Monthly Comic Alive magazine with the December 2014 issue to be sold on October 27, 2014. Seven Seas Entertainment has licensed the series in North America.

List of volumes
Absolute Duo

Absolute Duo Tea Party

Anime
An anime television series adaptation by Eight Bit was announced at Media Factory's 2014 Summer School Festival event. It aired between January 4 and March 22, 2015, on AT-X. It also aired on Tokyo MX, Sun Television, Kyoto Broadcasting System, Television Aichi Broadcasting and Nippon BS Broadcasting at later dates. Crunchyroll began streaming episodes to parts of Europe, the Middle East and Northern Africa in the same week, and Funimation has licensed the anime, broadcasting English-dubbed episodes on its online service starting March 16. Following Sony's acquisition of Crunchyroll, the series was moved to Crunchyroll.

Episode list

References

Light novels

 Vol. 1:  
 Vol. 2:  
 Vol. 3:  
 Vol. 4:  
 Vol. 5:  
 Vol. 6:  
 Vol. 7:

Manga

Other

External links
 Official anime website 
 Absolute Duo at ComicWalker 
 Absolute Duo at Funimation
 

2012 Japanese novels
Eight Bit (studio)
Anime and manga based on light novels
Fantasy anime and manga
Crunchyroll anime
Japanese fantasy novels
Light novels
Media Factory manga
MF Bunko J
Kadokawa Dwango franchises
Seinen manga
School life in anime and manga
Seven Seas Entertainment titles
Harem anime and manga